Ofir Gendelman (born July 19, 1971) is an Israeli diplomat and current spokesperson to the Arab media in the Israel Prime Minister's Office, a position he has held since April 2010, prior to which he served in the same role at the Israel Ministry of Foreign Affairs. Gendelman has been a regular fixture on various Arab media outlets since 2001.

Biography

Gendelman was born in Israel in 1971. He graduated from the Ha-Reali Ha-ivri high school in Haifa in 1989, majoring in Arabic and Islam and joined the Israeli Defense Forces, upon graduation and remaining in the service until 1994. In 1997 Gendelman received a dual bachelor's degree in international relations and in Middle Eastern studies from the Hebrew University of Jerusalem and in 2000 he received a  master's degree in Strategic Studies from Tel Aviv University. He later received another master's degree in Business Administration from Bar Ilan University in 2010.

Career

In 1998, Gendelman joined the Israeli Ministry of Foreign Affairs as an analyst on Palestinian affairs at the ministry's Center for Political Analysis, which is the foreign ministry's political intelligence bureau. In 2001 he joined the diplomatic training program at the ministry and graduated as a political officer with the rank of Second Secretary. Later that year he was appointed as the first ever foreign ministry spokesman to the Arab media, a role he fulfilled during the peak of the Second Intifada.

Gendelman was appointed as Consul and Second Secretary at the Israeli Embassy to Canada In 2003 and served there until 2007. He returned to Israel, assuming the role of deputy director of the Arab press and public diplomacy division of the foreign ministry. In 2008 he became the division's director and in this capacity was responsible to crafting and managing  the foreign ministry's public diplomacy campaigns to the Arab world and served also as the ministry's spokesman to the Arab media.
 
In 2009, Gendelman took a leave of absence from the foreign ministry and moved to the private sector where he became the founding CEO of the Israeli-Palestinian Chamber of Commerce and Industry (IPCC). In this role he worked to bring together Israeli and Palestinian businesspeople and companies and helped in creating joint ventures. In April 2010 he joined the Prime Minister's Office as its first ever spokesperson to the Arab world.

References

External links 
 Gendelman on the Israel MFA's Arabic YouTube

1971 births
Living people
Israeli diplomats
Israeli Jews
Arab mass media
Tel Aviv University alumni
Bar-Ilan University alumni
Hebrew University of Jerusalem Faculty of Social Sciences alumni